Iris is a 2014 American documentary film directed by Albert Maysles about the life of fashion icon Iris Apfel. It was one of Maysles' last films before his death in 2015.

Release 
Iris premiered at the 2014 New York Film Festival and was released theatrically the following year, shortly after Maysles died in March 2015. It was released on PBS's POV in 2016, after its theatrical run.

Reception
On Metacritic, Iris received a score of 80, indicating "generally favorable reviews", drawn from 25 reviews. In The New Yorker, film critic Richard Brody called the documentary "a grand, joyful testament" to both Apfel and Maysles' "artistic vision", revealing each as not only the visual artist but also the interlocutor whose commentary becomes part of the act of artistic creation.

References

External links

Iris at PBS' POV
Apfel and Maysles Q&A at Lincoln Center for the New York Film Festival, November 14, 2014

2014 films
2014 documentary films
American documentary films
Films about fashion
Films directed by Albert and David Maysles
2010s English-language films
2010s American films